Kawaguchi Dam is a gravity dam located in Tokushima prefecture in Japan. The dam is used for power production. The catchment area of the dam is 656.7 km2. The dam impounds about 87  ha of land when full and can store 6463 thousand cubic meters of water. The construction of the dam was started on 1956 and completed in 1960.

References

Dams in Tokushima Prefecture
1960 establishments in Japan